Paul Molac (born 21 May 1962) is a French politician who has been serving as a member of the French National Assembly since the 2012 elections, representing Morbihan's 4th constituency. In the 2017 elections, he was one of only four deputies who were elected in the first round.

Political career
In parliament, Molac has been serving on the Committee on Legal Affairs since 2012. He was also a member of the Defence Committee from 2013 until 2015). In addition to his committee assignments, he is part of the French-Irish Parliamentary Friendship Group. 

In 2018, Molac was one of the founding members of the Liberties and Territories parliamentary group.

In April 2021, Molac succeeded in securing cross-party support for a legislative proposal aimed at the protection of the heritage and promotion of France's regional languages. When the education ministry subsequently appealed the so-called "Molac law", the Constitutional Council ruled that it was out of line with article two (added in 1994) of the Constitution of France, which stipulates that the language of the French republic is French.

Political positions
In April 2018, Molac joined other co-signatories around Sébastien Nadot in officially filing a request for a commission of inquiry into the legality of French weapons sales to the Saudi-led coalition fighting in Yemen, days before an official visit of Saudi Crown Prince Mohammed bin Salman to Paris.

See also
 2017 French legislative election

References

1962 births
Living people
Deputies of the 14th National Assembly of the French Fifth Republic
Deputies of the 15th National Assembly of the French Fifth Republic
La République En Marche! politicians
People from Ploërmel
Politicians from Brittany
Deputies of the 16th National Assembly of the French Fifth Republic